James Emerson Uchrinscko was a Major League Baseball pitcher. He batted left-handed and threw right-handed. He made his major league debut on July 20, and his final game was 7 days later on July 27, 1926. He was born in West Newton, Pennsylvania, on October 20, 1900, and he died on March 17, 1995, in Mount Pleasant, Pennsylvania.

1900 births
1995 deaths
People from West Newton, Pennsylvania
Major League Baseball pitchers
Washington Senators (1901–1960) players
Baseball players from Pennsylvania